is a former Japanese football player. She played for Japan national team.

Club career
Tahara played for L.League club Fujita Tendai SC Mercury and Tasaki Perule FC.

National team career
On August 21, 1994, Tahara debuted for Japan national team against Austria.

National team statistics

References

Year of birth missing (living people)
Living people
Japanese women's footballers
Japan women's international footballers
Nadeshiko League players
Fujita SC Mercury players
Tasaki Perule FC players
Women's association football forwards